Thumbe is a census town in Dakshina Kannada district in the Indian state of Karnataka. Thumbe in Kannada literally means a minute white flower without any fragrance but considered extremely auspicious for worship of Shiva.

Demographics
 India census, Thumbe had a population of 5558. Males constitute 50% of the population and females 50%. Thumbe has an average literacy rate of 73%, higher than the national average of 59.5%: male literacy is 80%, and female literacy is 67%. In Thumbe, 12% of the population is under 6 years of age.

References

Cities and towns in Dakshina Kannada district